The 8th Golden Rooster Awards honoring the best in film of 1988, was given in Shenzhen, September 2, 1988.

Winners & Nominees

Special Award 
Special Jury Award
Thriller: The Last Frenzy
Comedy: 买买提外传
Director: Chen Kaige（King of the Children）
Actor: Liu Qiong（Death and the Maiden）

References

External links 
 The 8th Golden Rooster Awards

1988
1988 film awards
1988 in China
1980s in Chinese cinema